Squinzano is a town and comune   in the province of Lecce in the Apulia region of south-east Italy. It is the twelfth-most populous city in the province of Lecce.

Squinzano  is also a specific area within the Apulian wine region.  Squinzano DOC is produced in red and rosé versions, and is obtained principally from the Negro Amaro grape, with a small addition of Malvasia Nera di Brindisi and Malvasia Nera di Lecce.

References

Cities and towns in Apulia
Localities of Salento